The 1982 Men's Hockey Champions Trophy was the 4th edition of the Hockey Champions Trophy, an international men's field hockey tournament. It took place from 6 June to 13 June in Amstelveen, Netherlands. The Netherlands won the tournament for the second time in a row by finishing first in the round-robin tournament.

Results

Pool

Final standings

External links
Official FIH website

Champions Trophy (field hockey)
Champions Trophy
Hockey Champions Trophy
International field hockey competitions hosted by the Netherlands
Sports competitions in Amstelveen
Hockey Champions Trophy